José Ramón González Pérez (born 20 May 1968), known as José Ramón, is a Spanish former professional footballer who played as a midfielder.

Club career
Born in Carreira, Santa Uxía de Ribeira, José Ramón played ten seasons with Deportivo de La Coruña in two separate spells, but featured sparingly when the team competed in La Liga. He also represented Galician neighbours SD Compostela in the top division, where he amassed totals of 159 games and 13 goals.

José Ramón retired in 2001 at the age of 33, and subsequently worked as a manager, almost exclusively with Montañeros CF of Segunda División B. On 18 July 2014, he returned to his main club as youth coach.

Personal life
Ramón's younger brother, Fran, was a legend at Depor, and was also a Spanish international. His nephew, Nicolás, is also involved in the sport.

Honours
Deportivo
Copa del Rey: 1994–95

References

External links

Deportivo archives

1968 births
Living people
People from O Barbanza
Sportspeople from the Province of A Coruña
Spanish footballers
Footballers from Galicia (Spain)
Association football midfielders
La Liga players
Segunda División players
Segunda División B players
Tercera División players
Deportivo Fabril players
Deportivo de La Coruña players
SD Compostela footballers
CD Ourense footballers
Spanish football managers
Segunda División B managers
Tercera División managers